Danton Stone (born in Queens, New York) is an American stage, film and television actor.

Stage

Broadway
Fifth of July (1980) as Weston Hurley
Angels Fall (1983) as Don Tabaha
One Flew Over the Cuckoo's Nest (2001) as Martini

Off-Broadway (selected)
Mrs. Murray's Farm (1976)
Balm in Gilead (1984)
In This Fallen City (1986)
Fortune's Fools (1995)
Mere Mortals and Others (1997)

Regional
 One Flew Over the Cuckoo's Nest, Steppenwolf Theatre Company (2000)
Miss Julie, Steppenwolf Theatre Company (1985)

Filmography (selected)
 'The Chosen (1981) as Fighting Student
 National Lampoon's Joy of Sex (1984) as Farouk
 Maria's Lovers (1984) as Joe
 Band of the Hand (1986) as Aldo
 Eight Men Out (1988) as Hired Killer
 Checking Out (1989) as Dr. Wolfe
 Crazy People (1990) as Saabs
 Once Around (1991) as Tony Bella
 He Said, She Said (1991) as Eric
 McHale's Navy (1997) as Gruber
 The Atlantis Conspiracy (2001) as Barry
 Series 7: The Contenders (2001) as Bob
 Palindromes (2004) as Bruce Wallace
 The Girl in the Park (2007) as Drugstore Manager
 Diminished Capacity (2008) as Police Officer
 Beware the Gonzo (2010) as AP History Teacher

TV appearances
 Eischied (1979) as Eduardo Avila ("The U.N. Connection")
 American Playhouse (1982) as Weston 'Wes' Hurley ("The Fifth of July")
 ABC Afterschool Specials (1986) as J.T. ("The Gift of Amazing Grace")
 Thirtysomething (1988) as Brad Steadman (season 1, episode #16)
 Gideon Oliver (1989) as Luigi ("Tongs")
 Roseanne (1991-1992) as Jerry Bowman
 The Heights (1992) as Father Carmine ("What Does It Take?")
 The Jackie Thomas Show (1993) as David Speckler ("Guys and Balls")
 Grace Under Fire (1993) as Pete Bennett ("A Picture's Worth...$9.95")
 Tom (1994) as Rodney Wilhoit
 My So-Called Life (1995-96 series) as Neil Chase (episodes #2/16/18)
 Law & Order (1995) as Jack Wilderman (episode #119)
 Cosby (1996) ("Neighborhood Watch")
 The Tom Show (1997-1998) as Brownie
 Oz (1998–2000) as D.A. Pat Fortunato (episodes #12/14/27)
 Trinity (1999) ("Breaking In, Breaking Out, Breaking Up, Breaking Down")
 The Sopranos (2000) as Mr. Sontag (episode #17)
 Once and Again (2001) as Mr. Nerolik ("Thieves Like Us")
 Ed (2001) ("Closure") 
 Law & Order: Special Victims Unit (2002) as Building Superintendent ("Surveillance")
 Law & Order: Criminal Intent (2002) as Rick Morrissey (episode #18 - "Yesterday")
 Sex and the City (2002) as Patrick ("Unoriginal Sin")
 The Jury (2004) as Officer Morgenstern
 Jonny Zero (2005) as Gerald Hanes (episode #2)
 Hope & Faith (2006) as Ed (episode #65)
 Mercy (2009-2010) as Doctor

Awards
 Drama Desk Award Outstanding Ensemble Acting (1985) for Balm in Gilead''

References

External links

Year of birth missing (living people)
Living people
American male stage actors
American male film actors
American male television actors
Male actors from New York (state)
People from Queens, New York